The Hockey Association of Zimbabwe or HAZ is the governing body of field hockey in Zimbabwe. Its headquarters are in Harare, Zimbabwe. It is affiliated to IHF International Hockey Federation and AHF African Hockey Federation.

History

The Hockey Association of Zimbabwe was formed in 1925.
On 19 September 2014, Mrs Virginia Ross was made an Honorary Life Member of the Hockey Association of Zimbabwe.

See also
 Zimbabwe national field hockey team
 Zimbabwe women's national field hockey team at the 1980 Summer Olympics
 African Hockey Federation

References

External links
 Official website
 Zimbabwe Hockey FB

Zimbabwe
Hockey